Brainwash Gang is an indie video game developer based in Madrid, Spain. They released the roguelike platformer Nongünz in May 2017 for personal computer platforms, and are developing Damnview, an open world simulation game planned for release in 2022 for Nintendo Switch, PlayStation 4, Windows, and Xbox One platforms.

References 

Video game development companies
Companies based in Madrid